The rights of civilian and military prisoners are governed by both national and international law.  International conventions include the International Covenant on Civil and Political Rights; the United Nations' Minimum Rules for the Treatment of Prisoners, the European Committee for the Prevention of Torture and Inhuman or Degrading Treatment or Punishment, and the Convention on the Rights of Persons with Disabilities.

Rights and advocacy by country

Asia 
 Prisons in India
 Human rights in the Islamic Republic of Iran
 Committee for the Defense of Prisoners' Rights (Iran)
 2010 Iranian political prisoners' hunger strike for prisoners' rights
 Human rights in China
 Penal system in China
 Laogai
 Xinjiang re-education camps
 Notable prisons:
 Qincheng Prison
 Tilanqiao Prison
 Penal system of Japan
 Malaysian Prison Department
 Caning in Malaysia
 2020 Malaysia movement control order 
 Human rights in North Korea
Prisons in North Korea
 Kwalliso
 Hoeryong concentration camp
 Prisons in Pakistan
 Re-education camp (Vietnam)

Europe 
 Prison conditions in France
 Prisons in Germany
 Human right of prisoners in Israel
 Palestinian prisoners of Israel
 Crime in Italy
 Article 41-bis prison regime
 Human rights in Russia
 Prisoners' Union
 Human rights in the Soviet Union
 Gulag
 United Kingdom prison population
Preservation of the Rights of Prisoners
 Hirst v United Kingdom (No 2)
 Voting Eligibility (Prisoners) Bill
 1981 Irish hunger strike
 Children of Prisoners Europe

North America 
Incarceration in Canada
Correctional Service of Canada
John Howard Society
In the United States:
Human rights in the United States
Incarceration in the United States
Prisoner rights in the United States
Decarceration in the United States
 Prisoner abuse in the United States
 Felony disenfranchisement in the United States
 Penal labor in the United States
 Prison rape in the United States
 Organ donation in the United States prison population
 Mentally ill people in United States jails and prisons
 Political prisoners in the United States
 Notable groups:
November Coalition
Critical Resistance and Incite!
Incarcerated Workers Organizing Committee
Black and Pink
Notable events:
1971 Attica Prison riot
1973 Wapole Prison uprising
Abu Ghraib torture and prisoner abuse
Guantanamo Bay detention camp
Orleans Parish Prison abandonment during Hurricane Katrina
2013 California prisoner hunger strike
2016 U.S. prison strike
2018 U.S. prison strike
Chain gang
Convict leasing

Oceania 

 Punishment in Australia
 Indonesian children in Australian prisons
 Prisoners' rights in New Zealand
 Voting rights of prisoners in New Zealand
 Human rights in Vanuatu

International 
 Prisoners' rights in international law
 Standard Minimum Rules for the Treatment of Prisoners
 List of countries by incarceration rate
 List of hunger strikes
 List of prisons
Penal Reform International

See also 
Prisoner abuse
Prison abolition movement
Human rights issues related to the COVID-19 pandemic
 Death in custody
 Solitary confinement
 LGBT people in prison
 Prison–industrial complex
 Prison overcrowding
 Sentencing disparity
 Disfranchisement
 Private prison
Prison strike

References

External links 
Organizations working for prisoners' rights:
 American Civil Liberties Union on prisoners' rights
 Human Rights Watch
 Amnesty International
 Prison Activist Resource Center

Penal imprisonment
Penology
Human rights by issue